The 2014–15 Scottish Premiership was the second season of the Scottish Premiership, the highest division of Scottish football. The season began on 9 August 2014 and ended on the 31 May 2015. Celtic were the defending champions.

Twelve teams contested the league: Aberdeen, Celtic, Dundee, Dundee United, Hamilton Academical, Inverness CT, Kilmarnock, Motherwell, Partick Thistle, Ross County, St Johnstone and St Mirren. Due to the relegation of Edinburgh-based teams Heart of Midlothian and Hibernian in 2014, this season marked the first time in football history in which Scotland's capital city had no representatives in the top league.

On 2 May, Celtic clinched their fourth title in a row after Aberdeen lost 1–0 away at Dundee United, leaving Celtic 11 points clear with three games to play.

Teams
Dundee were promoted from the Scottish Championship. Heart of Midlothian were relegated from the Scottish Premiership.

Hibernian finished in the play-off position in the Scottish Premiership. They lost to Hamilton Academical who took the final place in the second edition of the competition, a result which left the Scottish capital Edinburgh without a club in the top flight of Scottish football for the 2014–15 season.

Stadiums by capacity and locations

Personnel and kits

Managerial changes

Tournament format and regulations

Basic 
In the initial phase of the season, the 12 teams played a round-robin tournament whereby each team played each one of the other teams three times. After 33 games, the league split into two sections of six teams, with each team playing each other in that section. The league attempts to balance the fixture list so that teams in the same section play each other twice at home and twice away, but sometimes this is impossible. A total of 228 matches were played, with 38 matches played by each team.

Promotion and relegation 
The team that finished 12th (St Mirren) was relegated to the Championship, while the champion of that league (Heart of Midlothian) was promoted to the Premiership for the 2015–16 season. The team that finished 11th in the Premiership (Motherwell) played the winner of the Championship playoffs (Rangers) in two playoff games, with the winner (Motherwell) securing a Premiership spot for the 2015–16 season.

League table

Results

Matches 1–22
Teams played each other twice, once at home, once away.

Matches 23–33
Teams played every other team once (either at home or away).

Matches 34–38
After 33 matches, the league split into two sections of six teams each, with teams playing every other team in their section once (either at home or away). The exact matches were determined upon the league table at the time of the split.

Top six

Bottom six

Top scorers

Premiership play-offs

Quarter-final

First leg

Second leg

Rangers won 3–2 on aggregate.

Semi-final

First leg

Second leg

Rangers won 2–1 on aggregate.

Final

First leg

Second leg

Motherwell won 6–1 on aggregate.

See also
Nine in a row

References

External links
Official website 

Scottish Premiership seasons
1
1
Scot